The Mosque of the Martyrs, also popularly known as the Turkish Mosque, is a mosque in Baku, Azerbaijan, near the Martyrs' Lane. The mosque was built in the beginning of the 1990s with assistance of the Turkish government. The mosque currently is used as an official residence of religious attaché of the Turkish embassy. The mosque has been under construction since 2009.

The 154th ayah from Al-Baqara chapter of Quran is written on the façade of the mosque in Arabic and Turkish:

"Do not say "Dead!" about those, who died for the sake of Allah. No, they are alive! But you do not feel."

See also
 List of mosques in Azerbaijan

References

Mosques in Baku
Azerbaijan–Turkey relations